Julyan Sinclair is an Orcadian television and radio presenter. He won a BAFTA in 2002 for "Best New Television Presenter" for his work on various Scottish Television arts and entertainment programmes.

Television career
He has previously hosted Scotsport, along with Jim Delahunt and Sarah O, on STV. Both Sinclair and Sarah O'Flaherty left the programme in 2006, with Jim Delahunt leaving shortly after. Sinclair has also directed network television programmes.

Julyan has appeared as a guest presenter on STV's daily lifestyle show The Hour on a few occasions, alongside main anchor Michelle McManus since November 2009. The Scottish magazine programme airs weekdays at 5pm.

Radio
Sinclair was an overseas correspondent for US and Australian radio stations, having spent a year in the US working for a radio station, and being employed at Triple J (the Australian version of the UK's Radio 1) during his time down under.

Sinclair hosted the XFM Scotland breakfast show until 7 November 2008 when XFM Scotland became part of the Galaxy Network and was renamed Galaxy Scotland.

Writing
Sinclair also writes for tabloids and broadsheets.

References

1976 births
Living people
People from Orkney
Scottish television presenters